The 4 × 100 metre mixed medley relay competition of the swimming events at the 2015 World Aquatics Championships was held on 5 August with the heats and the final.

Records
Prior to the competition, the existing world and championship records were as follows.

The following new records were set during this competition

Results

Heats
The heats were held at 10:49.

Final
The final was held at 19:19.

References

4 x 100 metre mixed medley relay
World